Bhattiprolu mandal is one of the 25 mandals in Bapatla district of the Indian state of Andhra Pradesh. It is under the administration of Tenali revenue division and the headquarters are located at Bhattiprolu. The mandal is situated on the banks of Krishna River, bounded by Kollur, Vemuru, Cherukupalle, Nagaram and Repalle mandals. The mandal headquarters ten villages are included in Andhra Pradesh Capital Region.

Demographics 

 census, the mandal had a population of 50,252. The total population constitute, 25,134 males and 25,118 females —a sex ratio of 999 females per 1000 males. 4,344 children are in the age group of 0–6 years, of which 2,281 are boys and 2,063 are girls. The average literacy rate stands at 70.65% with 32,436 literates.

Governance 

The mandal is partially a part of the Andhra Pradesh Capital Region under the jurisdiction of APCRDA. It is under the control of a tahsildar and the present tahsildar is D.V.Subba Rao.
Bhattiprolu mandal is one of the 5 mandals under  Vemuru (SC) (Assembly constituency), which in turn represents Bapatla (SC) (Lok Sabha constituency) of Andhra Pradesh.

Settlements 

 census, the mandal has #12 villages and no towns.

The settlements in the mandal are listed below:

Note:†–Mandal headquarter

Education 

The mandal plays a major role in education for the rural students of the nearby villages. The primary and secondary school education is imparted by government, aided and private schools, under the School Education Department of the state. As per the school information report for the academic year 2015–16, the mandal has more than 6,040 students enrolled in over 66 schools.

See also 
 List of mandals in Andhra Pradesh
 List of villages in Guntur district

References

Mandals in Guntur district